Clinical Nursing Research is a peer-reviewed nursing journal covering the field of clinical nursing. The Editor-In-Chief is Melissa D. Pinto, PhD, RN, FAAN (University of California, Irvine). It was established in 1992 and is currently published by SAGE Publications eight times a year.

Abstracting and indexing 
The journal is abstracted and indexed in:
 Academic Premier
 Current Contents/Social & Behavioral Sciences
 Science Citation Index
 Social Sciences Citation Index
 Scopus
According to the Journal Citation Reports, its 2014 impact factor is 1.278, ranking it 30 out of 110 journals in the category "Nursing" (Science) and 26 out of 108 journals in the category "Nursing" (Social Sciences).

References

External links 
 

SAGE Publishing academic journals
English-language journals
General nursing journals
Quarterly journals
Publications established in 1992